In postal history, a circular delivery company was a type of company which operated in Great Britain between 1865 and 1869 to deliver circulars and other printed matter at rates lower than the British Post Office charged. The service was outlawed in 1869 and a new cheaper postage rate for printed matter introduced in 1870. The stamps issued by the companies are much sought after by philatelists.

Origins 
The first such company was the Edinburgh and Leith Circular Delivery Company set up by Robert Brydone in 1865. Brydone undertook to deliver circulars within the boundaries of Edinburgh and Leith for one farthing each. He also delivered parcels which were not covered by the Post Office's monopoly. Brydone, a printer by trade, was declared bankrupt in 1866 but moved to London to form the London Circular Delivery Company which merged with the Metropolitan Circular Delivery Company in 1867.

Spread 

Further companies soon sprang up, some of which were connected with Brydone. They included:
Aberdeen Circular Delivery Company
Circular Delivery Company Limited
Clarke & Co. Edinburgh
Dundee Circular Delivery Company
Edinburgh & Leith Parcel Delivery Company
Glasgow Circular Delivery Company
Liverpool Circular Delivery Company
London & Metropolitan Circular Delivery Company
National Circular Delivery Company

Demise 
The spread of the circular delivery companies soon attracted the attention of the Post Office who had a legal monopoly on the collection and delivery of letters. In August 1867 the Post Office brought a legal action against the London & Metropolitan Circular Delivery Company for infringing their monopoly, which case they won, and the various companies are thought to have stopped operating by September 1867.

Legacy 

The demand for cheaper rates for printed materials was self-evident and on 1 October 1870 the British Post Office issued the first half penny stamp to pay the new reduced charge for printed papers, the small 1/2d bantam.

Collecting 
The stamps appear only in specialist catalogues. Many are thought to have been forged and some may have been produced purely for philatelic purposes and to have never seen genuine use. For these reasons, collectors prefer to collect the stamps on cover, however, such covers are rare. The stamps are classed as cinderellas or stamps for a local post.

References

Further reading
Harman, C.G. Great Britain: The stamps of the circular delivery companies and their forgeries. Cinderella Stamp Club & Frank Godden Ltd., 1990 64p.
Hurt, E.F. and L.N & M. Williams., eds. Handbook of the Private Local Posts. Jamaica, New York: Fritz Billig, 1950.
 Patton, Donald. Farthing Delivery: A Fight for Cheaper Postage. London: Lowe & Brydone (Printers) Ltd., 1960 55p.

External links

 The Circular Delivery Company Limited. Archived pages.
 Circular Delivery Company Issues by Tony Bellew.
 Circular Delivery Companies by I.B. RedGuy.
Cinderella stamps
Philately of the United Kingdom